The following list is a discography of production by The Smeezingtons, an American production and songwriting team from Los Angeles, California. It includes a list of songs produced, co-produced and remixed by year, artist, album and title.

Singles produced

2009

Far*East Movement – Animal 

03. "3D" (featuring Bruno Mars) (produced with the Stereotypes)

K'naan – Troubadour  
05. "Bang Bang" (featuring Adam Levine of Maroon 5)
07. "Wavin Flag (Coca-Cola Celebration Mix)" (2010)
16. "Biscuit" (Amazon.com bonus track)

Matisyahu – Light 

03. "One Day"

Flo Rida – R.O.O.T.S. 

05. "Right Round" (produced by Dr. Luke, Kool Kojak)

Sean Kingston – Tomorrow 

07. "Island Queen"
08. "Tomorrow"

Jibbs – Non-album single 

00. "The Dedication (Ay DJ)" (featuring Lloyd)

Travie McCoy – Non-album single 
00. "One At a Time"

2010

Sugababes – Sweet 7 

01. "Get Sexy"
06. "She's A Mess"
07. "Miss Everything" (featuring Sean Kingston)

B.o.B – B.o.B Presents: The Adventures of Bobby Ray 

02. "Nothin' on You" (featuring Bruno Mars)

Bruno Mars – It's Better If You Don't Understand (EP) 

01. "Somewhere in Brooklyn"
02. "The Other Side" (featuring Cee-Lo & B.o.B)
03. "Count on Me"
04. "Talking to the Moon"

Travie McCoy – Lazarus 

01. "Dr. Feel Good" (featuring Cee-Lo Green)
03. "Billionaire" (featuring Bruno Mars)
07. "We'll Be Alright" (produced with the Stereotypes)

Shontelle – No Gravity 

06. "DJ Made Me Do It" (featuring Asher Roth)

Mike Posner – 31 Minutes to Takeoff 

03. "Bow Chicka Wow Wow"

Sean Kingston - Non-album single 

 "Dumb Love"

Bruno Mars – Doo-Wops & Hooligans 

01. "Grenade"
02. "Just the Way You Are"
03. "Our First Time"
04. "Runaway Baby"
05. "The Lazy Song"
06. "Marry You"
07. "Talking to the Moon"
08. "Liquor Store Blues" (featuring Damian Marley)
09. "Count on Me"
10. "The Other Side" (featuring Cee Lo Green & B.o.B)
11. "Somewhere In Brooklyn"

Far East Movement – Free Wired 

01. "Girls On The Dancefloor" (featuring the Stereotypes) (produced with the Stereotypes)
03. "Rocketeer" (featuring Ryan Tedder) (produced with the Stereotypes)
04. "If I Was You (OMG)" (featuring Snoop Dogg) (produced with the Stereotypes)

Cee Lo Green – The Lady Killer 

03. "Fuck You"

Flo Rida – Only One Flo (Part 1) 

04. "Who Dat Girl" (featuring Akon) (produced by Dr. Luke & Benny Blanco)

Alexandra Burke – Overcome 

05. "Perfect"

2011

Bad Meets Evil – Hell: The Sequel 

07. Lighters (featuring Bruno Mars) (produced with Eminem and Battle Roy)

Lil Wayne – Tha Carter IV 

07. Mirror (featuring Bruno Mars) (produced with Ramon "REO" Owen of The Soundkillers)

Bruno Mars – The Twilight Saga: Breaking Dawn – Part 1 (soundtrack) 

03. It Will Rain

Snoop Dogg  & Wiz Khalifa – Mac & Devin Go to High School (soundtrack) 

07. Young, Wild & Free (featuring Bruno Mars)

Charice  – Infinity 

07. Before It Explodes

2012

Adam Lambert – Trespassing 

04. "Never Close Our Eyes"

The Very Best – MTMTMK 

12. "We OK" (featuring K'naan)

Nina Sky – Nicole and Natalie 

01. "Starting Today"

Neon Hitch – Non-album single 

00. Gold

Bruno Mars – Unorthodox Jukebox 

01."Young Girls"  
02."Locked Out of Heaven"  
03."Gorilla"  
04."Treasure"  
05."Moonshine"  
06."When I Was Your Man"  
07."Natalie"  
08."Show Me"  
09."Money Make Her Smile"  
10."If I Knew"
11."Old & Crazy" (featuring Esperanza Spalding)

2013

98 Degrees – 2.0 

11."The Long Way Home"

2014

Big Gipp – Mr. Get Down 

07. "Sugar, Cocoa and Honey" (featuring Bruno Mars)

2015

Adele – 25 

10."All I Ask"

Unknown date

Jibbs 

 "Get a Room"

J Soul Brothers ft. Sandaime 

 "Heaven"

Tina Parol 

 "I Can Make You Love Me"

Other songs 

"Cricket Communications"
"Dance In The Mirror" - Bruno Mars
"Don't Stop"
"Faded"- Bruno Mars
"Good Luck"
"Killa On The Run"- Bruno Mars
"Killin' Dem"
"Ladies Is Pimps Too" - Bruno Mars
"Mama's Worst Nightmare" - Bruno Mars
"Never Say You Can't" - Bruno Mars
"Stayin' Alive" 
"These Girls"
"Today My Life Begins" - Bruno Mars

References

External links 

Production discographies
Discographies of American artists
Hip hop discographies
Pop music discographies